Jindřich Svoboda (born 14 September 1952 in Adamov) is a Czech football player. He played for Czechoslovakia.

He was a participant at the 1980 Olympic Games, where Czechoslovakia won the gold medal, thanks to his winning goal in the final match.

In his country he played mostly for Zbrojovka Brno.

References

 Profile at ČMFS website

1952 births
Living people
Czech footballers
Czechoslovak footballers
Footballers at the 1980 Summer Olympics
Olympic footballers of Czechoslovakia
Olympic gold medalists for Czechoslovakia
Czechoslovakia international footballers
FC Zbrojovka Brno players
FC Fastav Zlín players
Olympic medalists in football
Medalists at the 1980 Summer Olympics
Association football forwards
People from Adamov (Blansko District)
Sportspeople from the South Moravian Region